The Good Die Young is a 1954 British crime film directed by Lewis Gilbert and starring Laurence Harvey, Gloria Grahame, Joan Collins, Stanley Baker, Richard Basehart and John Ireland. It was made by Remus Films from a screenplay based on the novel of the same name by Richard Macaulay. It tells the story of four men in London with no criminal past whose marriages and finances are collapsing and, meeting in a pub, are tempted to redeem their situations by a robbery.

Plot
Mike is an injured ex-boxer unable to find a job and penniless after his wife Angela, who he loves, gives their life savings to her criminal brother. Joe has quit his clerical job in the US to reclaim Mary, his pregnant English wife, who is unable to escape her clinging and unstable mother. Eddie deserts the US Air Force in an effort to regain Denise, his unfaithful actress wife. The fourth man is Rave, decorated in the war but now a womaniser and gambler sponging off his rich wife Eve, who wants to take him away to Kenya.

Rave has started an affair with a girl who works in a post office that handles consignments of used banknotes. He cajoles the other three into a night raid, supplying revolvers for show. In fact, to the horror of the others, he opens fire on approaching police and, when Mike tries to surrender, shoots him down as well. The three survivors make off with 100,000 pounds, sharing some and hiding the rest in a tomb beside a church. When Joe is not looking, Rave then kills Eddie but Joe outwits him and escapes.

Collecting his wife Mary, he rushes to the airport for a flight to the USA. Also there, waiting for Rave, is his wife Eve who has booked them a flight to Nairobi. Joe sees Rave arrive and shoots him, but as he falls he shoots Joe. All four men have died, leaving nobody who knows where the money is hidden.

Cast

 Laurence Harvey as Miles 'Rave' Ravenscourt
 Margaret Leighton as Eve Ravenscourt
 Stanley Baker as Mike Morgan
 Rene Ray as Angela Morgan
 John Ireland as Eddie Blaine
 Gloria Grahame as Denise Blaine
 Richard Basehart as Joe Halsey
 Joan Collins as Mary Halsey
 Robert Morley as Sir Francis Ravenscourt, Rave's father 
 Freda Jackson as Mrs Freeman, Denise's mother
 James Kenney as Dave, Angela's brother 
 Susan Shaw as Doris, girl in the pub 
 Lee Patterson as Tod Maslin
 Sandra Dorne as pretty girl 
 Leslie Dwyer as Stookey
 Patricia McCarron as Carole
 George Rose as Bunny 
 Joan Heal as Woman 
 Walter Hudd as Dr Reed 
 Harold Siddons as Hospital Doctor 
 Marianne Stone as Molly, the Barmaid 
 Edward Judd as 	Ron Simpson 
 MacDonald Parke as 	Mr. Carruthers 
 Patricia Owens as 	Winnie

Production
The film was presented by Romulus, the company of the Woolf Brothers, who made British films targeted at international audiences. This meant they used American stars. Filming started 28 September 1953. Jack Clayton was credited as the associate producer of this Remus production. The film was shot on location in London and at Shepperton Studios, with other scenes of Pan Am Boeing Stratocruiser aircraft at Heathrow Airport and the District Line around Barbican. The sets were designed by the art director Bernard Robinson.

The film's screenwriters changed the setting of Richard Macauley's original novel from Beverly Hills to 1950s London.  The British bank financing the film also required that the novel's bank robbery be switched to a post office in the film version. Laurence Harvey subsequently married Margaret Leighton, who played his wife in the film. Kirk Douglas visited Gloria Grahame and John Ireland on the set and appeared in the film as an extra as a joke.

Release
The film opened in the United Kingdom on 2 March 1954, with general release following on 5 April. The following year it was released in America by United Artists and France by Cinédis.

Notes

Further reading
 Variety staff (February 1, 1950). "Literati: Chatter". Variety. p. 53
 Reporter staff (August 18, 1953). "U.S. Coin Set for Romulus' 'Good'". The Hollywood Reporter. pp. 1, 5

External links
 
 
 
 The Good Die Young at TCMDB
 

1954 films
British crime drama films
British black-and-white films
Films based on American novels
Films directed by Lewis Gilbert
Films set in London
Films shot in London
1954 crime drama films
Films scored by Georges Auric
British heist films
Films shot at Shepperton Studios
1950s English-language films
1950s British films